Frogmore is an unincorporated community in Pointe Coupee Parish, Louisiana, United States.

Notes

Unincorporated communities in Pointe Coupee Parish, Louisiana
Unincorporated communities in Louisiana